Félix Gómez (born 1977) is a Spanish actor. He earned early success in Spain in the early 2000s for his performance in the television series Al salir de clase. He is also known for his performances in Amar en tiempos revueltos, 14 de abril. La República and High Seas.

Biography 
Born in Carmona, province of Seville, in 1977, Gómez had his television debut in the Andalusian regional series Plaza alta, whereas his debut in a feature film came with a minor performance in the 2000 comedy film Besos para todos. He earned success and public recognition in his early career for his performance as Jero Ruiz in the television series Al salir de clase, a role played by Gómez from 2000 to 2002 for close to 500 episodes. He later had a main cast role in the miniseries Padre coraje.

Filmography 

Television

Film

Accolades

References 

1977 births
21st-century Spanish male actors
Spanish male film actors
Spanish male television actors
Living people